The New World Agriculture and Ecology Group (NWAEG) is an organization focused on sustainable agriculture, conservation biology and social justice.

History

Originally known as the New World Agriculture Group, NWAEG (pronounced "new-ag") became active in the 1980s. NWAEG drew inspiration from the 1970s-1980s Science for the People movement, and many of its founding members were active in Science for the People.

NWAEG's best-known project was an intensive effort to provide agricultural research and extension services to the Nicaraguan people during the Sandinista era.  Cuba and Chiapas, Mexico are locations of other NWAEG projects, exemplifying the group's informal focus on Latin America.

References

External links
 Cornell University NWAEG Chapter

International environmental organizations